Carl Christian Hillman Jacobsen (2 March 1842 – 11 January 1914) was a Danish brewer, art collector and philanthropist. Though often preoccupied with his cultural interests, Jacobsen was a shrewd and visionary businessman and initiated the transition of the  brewery Carlsberg from a local Copenhagen brewery to the multinational conglomerate that it is today.

Background
Carl Jacobsen was born in Copenhagen, Denmark.
He was the son of J. C. Jacobsen (1811-1887),  who founded the brewery Carlsberg. After 1861, he  becoming a student from the Borgerdyd School in Christianshavn. From 1866, he conducted a four year study trip  to the leading breweries abroad.

Career
Jacobsen worked for his father but partly because of his conflicts between them, he founded his own brewery in 1882. It was first named Valby Brewery but upon his father's approval changed its name to Ny Carlsberg (English: New Carlsberg), while his father's enterprise at the same occasion changed its name to Gammel Carlsberg (English: Old Carlsberg). At his father's death, Carl Jacobsen did not at once obtain the leading post of the old brewery. Instead his father left it to the Carlsberg Foundation (Carlsbergfondet) which he had founded in 1876. In 1906 the two Carlsberg breweries  merged and Carl Jacobsen was CEO of Carlsberg. As a "sole ruler" he carried on his father’s work.

Artistic interest and philanthropy
Carl Jacobsen did not share his father's political commitment, though like him he was an eager cultural enthusiast known for his interest in Greek and classical art and his engagement led to the founding of the Ny Carlsberg Glyptotek  in 1897, an art museum mainly based upon his Antique collections still regarded as one of the most important Danish art museums.

Carl Jacobsen's interest in the arts is also demonstrated by his brewery. He employed the leading Danish architects of the time, mainly Vilhelm Dahlerup, and the buildings were designed with great care to detail as seen in the Winding Chimney.

Often taking part in discussions of architecture of Copenhagen, he paid for the restoration of several churches and public buildings and was also behind the 1913 sculpture The Little Mermaid.

Personal life
His wife  Ottilia Marie Jacobsen, née Stegmann (3 October 1854 - 20 July 1903), whom he met during a business trip to Edinburgh,  Scotland later marrying in Copenhagen on 24 September 1874), They were the parents of nine children 
born between 1875 and 1890. 

His wife was the daughter of the Danish grain merchant Lorents Konrad Carl Stegmann (aka Conrad Stegmann) and wife Margrethe Louise Marie, née Brummer. She was almost as famous as Jacobsen within the contemporary arts community in Denmark.

Carl Jacobsen became an extraordinary member of the Royal Danish Academy of Fine Arts (1897), honorary member of the Société des artistes français (1909), member (associé) of the Académie des Beaux-Arts (1913), Knight of the Order of the Dannebrog (1888), Dannebrogsmand (1891), Commander of the 2nd degree (1897) and of 1st degree 1906 and received the Grand Cross (1912).
Carl Jacobsen died during 1914 and was buried in the family mausoleum at  Jesus Church, Copenhagen.

See also
Carlsberg (district)
Carl Jacobsen House

References

Other sources
 Glamann, Kristof  (1996) Beer and Marble. Carl Jacobsen of New Carlsberg  (Copenhagen: Gyldendal)  
 Glamann, Kristof (1991)  Jacobsen of Carlsberg. Brewer and Philanthropist (Copenhagen: Gyldendal)  
Jørgensen, Ida Lunde (2018) Creating cultural heritage: three vignettes on Carl Jacobsen, his museum and foundation (Management and Organizational History, vol 13, 3) https://doi.org/10.1080/17449359.2018.1547645

Ny Carlsberg Glyptotek
Danish brewers
Danish art collectors
1842 births
1914 deaths
19th-century Danish businesspeople
20th-century Danish businesspeople
Businesspeople from Copenhagen
 Knights of the Order of the Dannebrog